This is a list of bands from Ireland (Republic of Ireland and Northern Ireland).

0-9
The 4 of Us

A
A House
The Academic
Adebisi Shank
The Aftermath
Alphastates
Altan
Altar of Plagues
An Emotional Fish
And So I Watch You From Afar
Anúna
The Answer
Ash
Aslan

B
B*Witched
The Baby Snakes
Bachelors
Bagatelle
Bell X1
Black Daisy
The Blades
Blaze X
Blink
The Blizzards
The Boomtown Rats
The Bothy Band
Boyzone
Brave Giant

C
Cactus World News
The Chapters
Channel One
Cheap Freaks
The Chieftains
Ceoltóirí Chualann
Clannad
Compulsion
The Coronas
The Corrs
The Cranberries
Cruachan
Cry Before Dawn
Celtic Woman
Celtic Thunder
The Chalets
Cruella de Ville

D
Danú
Dead Cat Bounce
Déanta
Delorentos
The Demise
Dervish
The Devlins
Director
Dirty Epics
The Divine Comedy
The Dubliners
The Duckworth Lewis Method

E
Eire Apparent
Energy Orchard
The Enemies

F
Fangclub
The Fat Lady Sings
Fight Like Apes
Flogging Molly
Floyd Soul and the Wolf
Follow My Lead
Fontaines D.C.
The Fountainhead
Four Men and a Dog
The Frames
The Frank and Walters
Fred
Funky Junction
The Fureys
Future Kings of Spain

G
Geasa
General Fiasco
giveamanakick
Glyder
Gráda
The Guggenheim Grotto
God Is An Astronaut

H
Hal
Halves
Ham Sandwich
The High Kings
The Hitchers
Hogan
Horslips
Hothouse Flowers
Hudson Taylor
Humanzi

I
Industry
Interference
Interrogate
Into Paradise
In Tua Nua
The Irish Rovers
Inhaler

J
The Jades
Jape
Jedward
Jody Has A Hitlist
Joyrider
The Johnstons
Juniper
JJ72

K 
Kerbdog 
Keywest 
Kíla
Kopek
Kodaline

L
Lankum
Lir
Lovechild
Le Galaxie
Lúnasa
Luv Bug
Little Green Cars

M
Mael Mórdha
Mexican Pets
Midnight Well
Mike Got Spiked
Mise
Mojo Fury
Mono Band
The Moondogs
Moving Hearts
Music for Dead Birds
My Bloody Valentine

N
Nolans
No Sweat
Nightbox
Nine Lies

O
O Emperor
Oppenheimer
O.R.B. – (Formerly The Original Rude Boys)

P
The Pale
Pay*Ola
Pet Lamb
Phoenix23
Picturehouse
Picture This
Pillow Queens
Planxty
the Pogues
Pony Club
Primordial
Pugwash
Pzazz

R
Rare
The Radiators From Space
Raglans
Reemo
Rend Collective
Rest
The Redneck Manifesto
Republic of Loose
The Revs
The Riptide Movement
Rollerskate Skinny
Rubyhorse

S
The Saw Doctors
Scheer
The Script
Scuba Dice
Scullion
Sephira
September Girls
Seo Linn
Shouting at Planes
Shrug
Silent Running
Size2shoes
Skara Brae
Skruff
Skid Row
Snow Patrol
Something Happens
Stand
The Sands Family
Stanley Super 800
The Stars of Heaven
Stiff Little Fingers
St. Laurence O'Toole Pipe Band
Stockton's Wing
The Strypes
The Stunning
The Sultans of Ping FC
Stump
Sweeney's Men
Sweet Savage

T
Tamalin
Taste
Tebi Rex
That Petrol Emotion
Therapy?
The Thrills
Them
Thin Lizzy
Third Harvest
This Club
The Tides
Those Nervous Animals
Tír na nÓg
Trinitones
True Tides
Turn
Two Door Cinema Club

U
U2
The Undertones

V
Villagers
Virgin Prunes
VNV Nation

W
The Walls
Waterboys
Walking on Cars
Waylander
We Should Be Dead
Westlife
Wild Youth 
Wilt
Whipping Boy
Wolfe Tones
Wreck of the Hesperus
Wyvern Lingo

References